Vigmostad is a village in Lindesnes municipality in Agder county, Norway. The village is located along the Audna river in the Audnedalen valley. Vigmostad Church is located in the village.

Name

The village (and the parish) is named after the old Vigmostad farm (Old Norse: Vígmundarstaðir), since that is the location of Vigmostad Church. The first element of the name is the old male name Vígmundar (river-mouth) or Vígmarr (river-mare(sea)) and the last element is staðir which means "homestead" or "farm".

References

External links

Weather information for Vigmostad 

Villages in Agder
Lindesnes